Clare is a surname of English or Irish origin. The name is most often derived from the titular de Clare first held by Richard fitz Gilbert, a Welsh lord from a Norman family, who took it from Clare, Suffolk. The name is also prevalent among families of Irish origin, both from de Clare and from etymologically unrelated place names such as Clare County, Clare Island and River Clare in Ireland which attests to a long historical relationship with those places.

Notable people with the surname Clare
 Alex Clare (born 1985), English singer-songwriter
 Alys Clare (real name Elizabeth Harris, born 1944), author of English historical whodunnit novels
 Anthony Clare (1942–2007), Irish psychiatrist and broadcaster
 Cassandra Clare (real name Judith Rumelt, born 1973), American author of young adult fiction
 Craig Clare (born 1984), New Zealand professional rugby union player
 Daryl Clare (born 1978), Jersey-born Irish professional footballer and manager
 Diane Clare (1938–2013), English film and television actress
 Dustin Clare (born 1982), Australian actor
 George Clare (disambiguation), several people
 Horatio Clare (born 1973), author and journalist
 Ina Clare (1932/1933–2010), British actress
 James Clare (1857–1930), English-born international rugby union player
 Jason Clare (born 1972), Australian politician
 Jillian Clare (born 1992), American actress and singer
 John Clare (disambiguation), several people
 Jonathan Clare (born 1986), English cricketer
 Kerry and Lindsay Clare, Australian wife and husband architects
 Leanne Clare, Australian judge
 Madelyn Clare (1894–1975), American actress
 Mary Clare (1892–1970), English actress
 Natalia Clare (1919–2007), American ballet dancer and instructor
 Octavius Leigh-Clare (1841–1912), English barrister and politician
 Osbert of Clare (died in or after 1158), English monk
 Patti Clare (born 1958), English actress
 Robert Clare (born 1983), English professional football player and manager
 Roy Clare (born 1950), English Royal Navy admiral and senior civil servant
 Sidney Clare (1892–1972), American comedian, dancer and composer
 Thomas Clare (disambiguation), several people

Notable people with the surname de Clare
de Clare family, a Norman and English aristocratic family in medieval times
Amice de Clare (c. 1220–1284), daughter of Gilbert de Clare, 4th Earl of Hertford
Gilbert de Clare (disambiguation), various people
Isabel de Clare (disambiguation), several people
Richard de Clare, 2nd Earl of Pembroke (1130–1176)
Richard fitz Gilbert (1035–1090), 1st Lord of Clare, known as "Robert de Clare"
Richard de Clare, 3rd Earl of Hertford (1153–1217)
Walter de Clare (1075–1137), Lord of Nether Gwent

Fictional characters
 Angel Clare in Tess of the d'Urbervilles
 Ada Clare in Bleak House

See also
 Clare (disambiguation)
 Clare (given name)

Surnames of Irish origin